JDS Ojika (LST-4152) was the second ship of the s of the Japanese Maritime Self-Defense Force. She was commissioned on 22 March 1976.

Development and design 
The Maritime Self-Defense Force's transport and landing craft unit set up a fleet in 1955 with six general-purpose landing craft (LCUs) and 29 mobile landing craft (LCMs) provided by the U.S. Navy under the MSA Agreement. And. Subsequently, in 1961, based on the MSA agreement, three LST-542-class tank landing ships (LST-1 class final type) retired by the U.S. Navy were donated and started operation as Osumi type transport ships.

The three ships of the same type formed the first transport corps under the control of the Yokosuka District Force, but on May 1, 1962, they were reassigned under the direct control of the Self-Defense Fleet and engaged in maritime transport and maritime operation transport. It was an extremely practical landing ship except for the lack of speed, but all of them were built from 1944 to 1945, and since they will reach the end of their useful life in the 40's of the Showa era, an alternative ship is needed. Was there. For this reason, the design of the 1,500-ton type (45LST), which had been built for the district corps a little earlier, was expanded, and it was built as a 2,000-ton type transport ship for agile operation under the SDF fleet.

Construction and career 
She was laid down on June 10, 1974 at Ishikawajima Harima Tokyo No. 2 Factory as the 1973 planned transport ship No. 4152 based on the 4th Defense Force Development Plan, and launched on September 4, 1975, 1976. Commissioned on March 22, 2014, it was incorporated into the 1st Transport Corps under the direct control of the Self-Defense Fleet and deployed in Yokosuka. 

They joined and arrived at the port of Sihanukville in Cambodia on October 2. Returned to Yokosuka on December 26th. 

She was decommissioned on August 10, 2001. The total itinerary during commissioning reached 387,699 nautical miles, 18 laps of the earth.

References 

Miura-class tank landing ships
Ships built by IHI Corporation
1975 ships